Sennia Nanua (born 2002, Nottingham, England) is a British actress. 

In 2015, she appeared in the British short film Beverley, before making her full-length feature debut as the eponymous character in the BAFTA-nominated  The Girl With All The Gifts when she was 13 years old. Nanua appeared in Jessica Hynes' directing debut, The Fight, released in 2019.

Filmography

Awards and nominations

References

External links
 

Living people
2002 births
Black British actresses
English people of Ghanaian descent